Young & Dangerous (stylised as YOUNG&DANGEROUS) is the second album by English rock band The Struts, released on 26 October 2018 through Interscope Records. It was primarily recorded while the band was on tour; "Primadonna Like Me", "Body Talks" and "Bulletproof Baby" were released as singles prior to its release. The album title comes from a line in the chorus of the track Freak Like You. The band began a world tour in September 2018 in support of the album.

Critical reception

The album has received a score of 81 on review aggregator Metacritic, based on reviews from six critics. Will Hermes of Rolling Stone gave the album three-and-a-half stars out of five, and said that while "Kiss This" was the band's "first notable achievement, their second LP advances the notion that maybe ignoring the last 30 or 40 years of pop trends isn't the best approach". Hermes highlighted the style of frontman Luke Spiller, calling "Ashes (Part 2)" "a cross between a Bat Out of Hell outtake and hairmetal Maroon 5". He also deemed "Body Talks" the "Kiss This" of the album, calling it "an over the top chant-pop anthem that's winning on first listen, irritating soon after", saying that even "if it fails to be more than the sum of its 'woo!'s, it's still effective, and gets bonus points for the remix with Kesha". The song "Bulletproof Baby" is featured on EA Sports' video game NHL 19.

Track listing

Charts

References

2018 albums
The Struts albums
Interscope Records albums
Albums produced by Butch Walker